Hi Working Girl is a 2003 Taiwanese romantic comedy television series directed by Huang Ke-i and Wu Ssu-ta and starring Jolin Tsai and Show Lo. The series premiered on CTV on March 19, 2003. It is based on the Japanese comic series Asakura-kun Chotto! created by Kenichi Oishi and Yumemi Ishiduka, and it tells the story of what happened after Fu I-ling, a staff of the general affairs department of an advertising company, met Cheng Ta-lun, the chief of the department.

Plot 
Fu I-ling (Jolin Tsai) is a pure and innocent girl. She firmly believes that human nature is inherently good, and she believes that there is nothing that cannot be solved in this world. With her "housewife" personality, it is perfect for her to work in the company's general affairs department. But other colleagues in the general affairs department are all weirdos, including a supervisor who likes to scold others, a money digger who loves vanity, and a senior who just wants to marry herself all day long. They all like to bully I-ling and push work to her, but I-ling never complained. She feels that she must be not smart or hard enough. She believes that work and censure are a kind of training and a necessary process in her life.

Until one day the appearance of Cheng Ta-lun (Show Lo) changed I-ling's life. Ta-lun saw I-ling's cuteness and strengths, and while he becomes the driving force for I-ling to come to work every day, he is also deeply attracted by I-ling. But the innocent I-ling never thought that she would be favored by Ta-lun, she just hopes that she would be supremely happy to watch Ta-lun silently by his side every day. Even Ta-lun summoned up the courage to show his love, but I-ling, who is a love idiot, couldn't feel it. Ta-lun could only continue to be entangled by the other two girls.

With Ta-lun's support, I-ling shows her enthusiasm as a "housewife" to the fullest. She helped bald clients find confidence, coordinated the infighting among company's executives, and accompanied the boss of a candy company on a Valentine's Day trip, helped a colleague find a ring in the elevator, signed an impossible contract, found a missing advertising star, etc. All kinds of impossible tasks are solved one by one by I-ling, and it is all up to her perseverance, stupidity, and hard work. This not only made I-ling more popular in the company and her life more fulfilling, but also made Ta-lun like her more and fell in love with her deeply.

But I-ling is not brave in the face of her love. She doesn't believe that Ta-lun will like her the ordinary girl, so she lets the opportunities pass by her side again and again, until one day she realizes that Ta-lun is about to leave her if she can't seize the opportunity, so she finally musters up the courage to say "I love Ta-lun".

Cast 

 Jolin Tsai as Fu I-ling
 Show Lo as Cheng Ta-lun
 Megan Lai as Tseng Ai-lin
 Wen Wen as Hsia Wei-chi
 Shan Cheng-ju as Chen Liang-kuang
 Renzo Liu as Tou
 Kasai Kenji as Kasai
 Darryl Kuo as Wang Chih-wei
 Kimi Hsia as A Mei
 Fu Lei as Chariman
 Chen Hsien-shih as Fist Master
 I Che-li as Fu I-ling's mother
 Ing Tsai-ling as Cheng Ta-lun's mother
 Lin Mei-hsiu as Chen Liang-kuang's wife
 Andy On as Sun Ta-chieh
 Wang Jen-chien as Li Tien-chueh
 Ken Chu as Ken Chu
 Pink Yang as Ken Chu's girlfriend
 Duncan Chow as Ken Chu's manager
 Hsieh Chi-wen as Chang
 Jason Lee as Che
 Wallace Chung as Johnny
 Hou Ya-fang as Chen Yuan-yuan
 Li Chia-chen as Hotel Lady Boss
 Chang Li-wei as Li Yu-chun
 Yuki Hsu as Li Hsiao-in
 Penny Lin as Cheng Ta-li
 Lei Wei-yuan as Fu I-ling's father
 Hsu Kuei-in as Fu I-li
 Gigi Lin as Sun Ta-chieh's sister
 Terry Lin as Chun Chieh
 Eddie Hsu as A Tuo
 Chang Chi-hui as Chia Chia
 Chen Yen-an as Wu Ya-hui
 Kuo Chang-ju as Cheng Ta-lun's grandfather

Soundtracks

Release 
Beginning on March 19, 2003, the series aired one episode per week in Taiwan on CTV. Beginning on May 12, 2004, it aired one episode per week in Hong Kong on Family Entertainment Channel. Beginning on October 1, 2006, it aired three episodes per day in China on CCTV-1. In addition, the series was released in the formats of DVD and VCD in Taiwan, Hong Kong, Singapore, and Malaysia.

Critical reception 
Yangzhou Evening News commented: "Hi Working Girl is a typical Taiwanese humor, which seems a little nonsensical, but it makes sense when you think about it carefully. Such a television series with simple relationships between characters makes people feel very relaxed, each character has a distinctive personality and is easy to remember." Sina Entertainment commented: "Hi Working Girl not only won the audience a relaxed smile with slightly exaggerated performance and plot, but also implies a very realistic story. The reason is that it does not use the way of preaching, but shows it to the audience in such a way hidden behind the laughter." Bandao Metropolis Daily commented: "Because Jolin Tsai seldom appears in television series and movies, and she has intimate scenes with her rumored boyfriend Show Lo in the series, it still attracted a lot of attention from fans. But for Jolin Tsai, acting skills are undoubtedly her 'weak point'. Jolin Tsai, who is proficient in singing and dancing, shows her hands are tied when facing the filming camera."

References

External links 
 

2003 Taiwanese television series debuts
2003 Taiwanese television series endings
China Television original programming
Taiwanese television dramas based on manga
Taiwanese romantic comedy television series